Horseneck was an unincorporated community located in Pleasants County, West Virginia, United States. The Horseneck Post Office is no longer open.

References 

Unincorporated communities in West Virginia
Unincorporated communities in Pleasants County, West Virginia